Rhinoscapha richteri is a species of true weevil. It occurs in New Guinea.

References 

 Zipcodezoo
 Global species

richteri
Entiminae